Tawny Pipit is a British comedy film produced by Prestige Productions in 1944. It tells of how the residents of a small English village collaborate when the nest of a pair of rare tawny pipits is discovered there.

It is one of the first films to have a nature conservation theme: with one scene featuring a girl standing in front of a line of Covenanter tanks to prevent military training from disturbing the birds. Balanced against the conservation themes it also includes now-illegal practices, such as collecting rare bird eggs.

A secondary theme is criticism of government interference with farming practices, such as enforced ploughing, in areas where the farmers themselves generally know best.

Plot
During the Second World War, Jimmy Bancroft (Niall MacGinnis), a fighter pilot just released from hospital, and his nurse (now his girlfriend) Hazel Broome (Rosamund John) are on a walking tour through the countryside. They arrive at the (fictional) village of Lipsbury Lea and, being keen birdwatchers, discover that a pair of tawny pipits, which are rarely seen in England, are nesting nearby.

News of the rare discovery spreads and groups of twitchers arrive from the cities to try to see the birds.

Jimmy and Hazel enlist several locals to protect the nesting site until the eggs hatch. The villagers do so with great enthusiasm, led by the fiery retired Colonel Barton-Barrington (Bernard Miles) and the Reverend Mr. Kingsley.

The field where the nest is located (known locally as the pinfold) is due to be ploughed by order of the county's War Agricultural Executive Committee (the "War Ag"), and a delegation to the Ministry of Agriculture in London fails to get the order rescinded. The minister was Barton-Barrington's "fag" at his public school, Marlborough, and personally intervenes to save the field from being ploughed.

During the period the village is visited by a female Russian soldier campaigning for public support during the German occupation of Russia. She says that Russia also respects the countryside and farming. The colonel presents her with a sniper rifle.

The eggs duly hatch, but not before a plot to steal them on behalf of an unscrupulous dealer is foiled by an alert army corporal (a professional ornithologist) who is serving nearby.

At the end the village give thanks in the local church while a Spitfire flown by Jimmy tips its wing in a low level flight over the village. The plane has been renamed "anthus campestris" (Tawny Pipit).

Cast

 Bernard Miles as Colonel Barton-Barrington
 Rosamund John as Hazel Broome
 Niall MacGinnis as Jimmy Bancroft
 Jean Gillie as Nancy Forester, a "land girl" (member of the Women's Land Army)
 Lucie Mannheim as Russian Soldier
 Christopher Steele as Rev. Mr. Kingsley
 Brefni O'Rorke as Uncle Arthur
 George Carney as Whimbrel
 Wylie Watson as Crasker
 John Salew as Pickering

 Marjorie Rhodes as Mrs. Pickering
 John Rae as Mr. Dougall
 Ann Wilton as Miss Pennyman
 Ernest Butcher as Tommy Fairchild
 Grey Blake as	Captain Dawson
 Bill Wilson as Tank Driver
 Ian Fleming as Schoolmaster
 Katie Johnson as Miss Pyman
 Joan Sterndale-Bennett as Rose
 Stuart Latham as Corporal Philpotts

Authenticity

James Fisher and Julian Huxley were credited as ornithological advisers for the film. Nevertheless,  Eric Hosking's footage of the pipits was actually of meadow pipits because he could not get genuine tawny pipits from German-occupied Europe.

Filming location
Location filming was done in Lower Slaughter in the Cotswolds. The precise whereabouts of the fictional Lipsbury Lea are not specified, but the local pub serves ales brewed in Burford, which is in Oxfordshire, close to the boundary with Gloucestershire. The railway station seen briefly in the film was Stow-on-the-Wold.

Propaganda value
By the time the film was released (not until 1947 in the United States), the threat of invasion had subsided, but it was still seen as an effective piece of propaganda. It showed the love of the English for their country and all classes of society uniting for the common good. A subplot shows Barton-Barrington presenting his Browning Automatic Rifle to Corporal Bokolova (Lucie Mannheim), a Russian soldier on a goodwill tour, whilst giving a fiery speech about some foreigners being "jolly good chaps".

Reception
Rosamund John was later to say, "Rank didn't think they would be able to sell it to America so it was stashed away for a while. When it was shown, it was wildly popular, because it was everything the Americans thought of as being English."

The New York Times wrote, "Seldom does such a piece of unsophisticated charm and humor reach the screen, but this is one that is presented in such an utterly beguiling fashion that it would be a grave error not to see it."

References

External links
 
Review of film at Variety

1944 films
British World War II propaganda films
British black-and-white films
Films directed by Bernard Miles
Villages in Gloucestershire
Films about birds